Slop or SLOP may refer to:
Slop (clothing)
Hose (clothing)
Slop is the common name for household food scraps
Strategic Lateral Offset Procedure, in aviation, a procedure for avoiding collisions
 a popular term for Backlash (engineering)
The Secret Life of Pets, a 2016 animated film
Self-selecting opinion poll, a poll or survey where the results reflect those individuals who choose to participate
Slop (S.L. OP) has been used as military slang for Special Operations cohorts
Doctor Slop, a character in the 1759 novel Tristram Shandy
Jan Janz Slop (1643–1727), painter of the Dutch Golden Age
Slop(s) is/are the residue of seawater washing of tanks in oil tankers, see crude oil washing